Sankt Georgen im Schwarzwald (Low Alemannic: Sanderge) is a town in Southwestern Baden-Württemberg, Germany and belongs to Schwarzwald-Baar County.

Museums
 Sammlung Grässlin, art museum
 Germans Phono Museum, Phono Museum

References

External links
 Citizens Cityweb www.St-Georgen.ORG, News, Information, Photos and Events of citizens in St. Georgen 
  St. Georgen: information and pictures
 Art with free beer and sausages, on the Grässlin family's art collection in Sankt Georgen

Schwarzwald-Baar-Kreis
Sankt Georgen im Schwarzwald